Different Sides of the Sun is the debut studio album by British-American electronic music group Hot Natured. It was released in August 2013, through the Warner Music Group and their own label Hot Creations. It features Ali Love, Anabel Englund, Róisín Murphy, The Egyptian Lover, Kenny Glasgow and S.Y.F.

Singles
 "Forward Motion"  was the first single released from the album and features vocals from Ali Love, who was eventually chosen to become the lead vocalist for the band, joining James Jones and Lee Foss. The song was originally released on 21 March 2012 as an extended mix on YouTube.
 "Benediction" was the second single. Like the previous single, it was originally uploaded in 2012 as an extended mix as a collaboration with Ali Love, however, on 25 June 2014, it was officially released after Love was credited as the lead vocalist of the band. It peaked at number forty on the Official UK Singles Chart.
 "Reverse Skydiving"  was the third single. It was also the first song by Hot Natured to have a music video made for it. It features vocals from Anabel Englund, who was also set up to be a co-writing member of the band. The track peaked at number fifty-six on the Official UK Singles Chart.
 "Isis (Magic Carpet Ride)"  was the fourth single to be released from the album. It features vocals from rapper and spoken lyricist The Egyptian Lover.

Critical reception
NME wrote that "weak songwriting makes for an ok album, but not much more."

Track listing

Charts

References

External links

2013 debut albums
Hot Natured albums
Warner Records albums